Lethe  atkinsonia,   the  small goldenfork, is a species of Satyrinae butterfly found in the  Indomalayan realm (Sikkim to Bhutan) .

References

atkinsonia
Butterflies of Asia